The 2014 Perth Darts Masters was the inaugural staging of a tournament by the Professional Darts Corporation, as a third entry in the 2014 World Series of Darts. The tournament featured 16 players and was held at the HBF Stadium in Perth, Western Australia from 22–24 August 2014.

Phil Taylor won the title by defeating Michael van Gerwen 11–9 in the final.

Prize money
The total prize fund was £73,000.

Qualifiers
The eight seeded PDC players were:

  Michael van Gerwen (runner-up)
  Phil Taylor (winner)
  Adrian Lewis (withdrew)  Simon Whitlock (quarter-finals)
  Peter Wright (quarter-finals)
  Dave Chisnall (semi-finals)
  James Wade (semi-finals)
  Raymond van Barneveld (quarter-finals)
  Paul Nicholson (quarter-finals)

Adrian Lewis decided not to compete in the event and was replaced by Paul Nicholson, who was originally a wildcard selection. An additional place was therefore on offer to the leading non-qualified player from the DPA Australian Grand Prix Order of Merit on August 18.

The Oceanic qualifiers were:
  Kyle Anderson (first round)
  Beau Anderson (first round)
  Warren Parry (first round)
  Laurence Ryder (first round)
  Vinay Cooper (first round)
  Justin Miles (first round)
  Shane Tichowitsch (first round)
  David Platt (first round)

Draw

References

Perth Darts Masters
Perth Darts Masters
World Series of Darts
Sports competitions in Perth, Western Australia

2010s in Perth, Western Australia